Holdsworth was a UCI Continental team founded in 2018. Although the team is British-based, with its headquarters in Rotherham, Yorkshire, it is Irish-registered. The founding of the team marked the return of the bicycle brand to competition after a 40 year absence, with the Holdsworth name being revived by Planet X founder Dave Loughran. In 2017, the team announced their intention to race in the 2018 Tour de Yorkshire: their place was confirmed in March 2018.

Team roster

Major results
2018
Stage 6 Rás Tailteann, Sean McKenna

References

UCI Continental Teams (Europe)
Cycling teams based in the United Kingdom
Cycling teams established in 2018